Kani Shilan (also Romanized as Kānī Shīlān; also known as Shīlān) is a village in Buin Rural District, Nanur District, Baneh County, Kurdistan Province, Iran. At the 2006 census, its population was 79, in 13 families. The village is populated by Kurds.

References 

Towns and villages in Baneh County
Kurdish settlements in Kurdistan Province